was a town located in Tōhaku District, Tottori Prefecture, Japan.

As of 2003, the town had an estimated population of 8,011 and a population density of 655.03 persons per km2. The total area was 12.23 km2.

On October 1, 2004, Hawai, along with the town of Tōgō, and the village of Tomari (all from Tōhaku District), was merged to create the town of Yurihama.

External links
 Yurihama town website 

Dissolved municipalities of Tottori Prefecture
Tōhaku District, Tottori
Yurihama, Tottori